The Satilla Formation is a geologic formation in Georgia, United States. It preserves fossils.

See also

 List of fossiliferous stratigraphic units in Georgia (U.S. state)
 Paleontology in Georgia (U.S. state)

References
 

Geologic formations of Georgia (U.S. state)